Senator Dixon may refer to:

Members of the Northern Irish Senate
Sir Thomas Dixon, 2nd Baronet (1868–1950), Northern Irish Senator from 1924 to 1949

Members of the United States Senate
Archibald Dixon (1802–1876), U.S. Senator from Kentucky
James Dixon (1814–1873), U.S. Senator from Connecticut
Joseph M. Dixon (1867–1934),  U.S. Senator from Montana from 1907 to 1913
Nathan F. Dixon I (1774–1842), U.S. Senator from Rhode Island
Nathan F. Dixon III (1847–1897), U.S. Senator from Rhode Island

United States state senate members
Abram Dixon (1787–1875), New York Senate
Alan J. Dixon (1927–2014), Illinois State Senate
Bob Dixon (Missouri politician) (born 1969), Missouri State Senate
Larry Dixon (politician) (1942-2020), Alabama State Senate

See also
Senator Dickson (disambiguation)